Cellular memory modules (CMMs) refers to the ability of cells to remember and propagate their gene expression programs throughout the entire development. This basic developmental function has been conserved during evolution, as related mechanisms were identified in other model organisms.

References

Cell biology